The Journal of Materials Engineering and Performance is a monthly peer-reviewed scientific journal published by Springer Science+Business Media on behalf of ASM International. The editor-in-chief is Rajiv Asthana (University of Wisconsin). The journal covers all aspects of materials engineering broadly described as materials selection, design, processing, characterization, and evaluation. The scope includes all substances used in engineering applications with a tendency toward constituent materials that comprise a larger system.

Abstracting and indexing 
This journal is abstracted and indexed by:

According to the Journal Citation Reports, the journal has a 2021  impact factor of 1.819.

References

External links 
 

Materials science journals
Springer Science+Business Media academic journals
Monthly journals
Publications established in 1992
English-language journals